Julien Benneteau and Édouard Roger-Vasselin were the defending champions, but Benneteau withdrew from the tournament because of a sports hernia. Roger-Vasselin played alongside Guillermo García-López, but lost in the third round to Ivan Dodig and Marcelo Melo.

Dodig and Melo went on to win the title, defeating Bob and Mike Bryan in the final, 6–7(5–7), 7–6(7–5), 7–5.

Seeds

Draw

Finals

Top half

Section 1

Section 2

Bottom half

Section 3

Section 4

References

External links
Main Draw
2015 French Open – Men's draws and results at the International Tennis Federation

Men's Doubles
French Open - Men's Doubles
French Open by year – Men's doubles